The Roman Catholic Diocese of Cienfuegos is a suffragan diocese of the Archdiocese of Camagüey. The original Diocese of Cienfuegos was erected in 1903 and renamed as the Diocese of Cienfuegos-Santa Clara in 1971. That diocese was split in 1995 to form the Dioceses of Cienfuegos and Santa Clara.

Bishops

Ordinaries
Antonio Aurelio Torres y Sanz, O.C.D. (1904 - 1916)
Valentín Zubizarreta y Unamunsaga, O.C.D. (1922 - 1925), appointed Archbishop of Santiago de Cuba 
Eduardo Pedro Martínez y Dalmau, C.P. (1935 - 1961)
Alfredo Antonio Francisco Müller y San Martín (1961 - 1971)
Fernando Ramon Prego Casal (1971 - 1995)
Emilio Aranguren Echeverria (1995 - 2005)
Domingo Oropesa Lorente (since 2007)

Auxiliary bishops
Francisco Ricardo Oves Fernández (1969-1970), appointed Archbishop of San Cristobal de la Habana
Fernando Ramon Prego Casal (1969-1970), appointed Bishop here
Emilio Aranguren Echeverria (1991-1995), appointed Bishop here

Other priest of this diocese who became bishop
Marcelo Arturo González Amador, appointed Auxiliary Bishop of Santa Clara in 1998

External links and references

Cienfuegos
Cienfuegos
Cienfuegos
Roman Catholic Ecclesiastical Province of Camagüey